Huck's Defeat or the Battle of Williamson's Plantation was an engagement of the American Revolutionary War that occurred in present York County, South Carolina on July 12, 1780, and was one of the first battles of the southern campaign to be won by Patriot militia.

Background
In May 1780, the British captured the only significant American army in the South at  Charleston, South Carolina and quickly occupied four vital seats of government:Camden, Cheraw, Georgetown, and Ninety Six. Believing the Whigs had been crushed in South Carolina, Sir Henry Clinton abrogated the terms of surrender, which had allowed parolees to remain neutral for the remainder of the war. Under terms of the proclamation of June 3, 1780, Patriots or Whigs (as they were commonly known) were compelled to either take an oath of loyalty to the king or be regarded as "rebels and enemies of their country." Clinton then departed for New York, leaving Lieutenant General Charles, Earl Cornwallis in command of the British army in the South.

In the absence of civil government in South Carolina (Governor John Rutledge had fled to North Carolina when Charleston fell),  backcountry Whigs selected their own leaders to continue the fight against the "senseless cruelty of the Tory militia" and the "cruel and contemptuous treatment of the populace" by British Legion commander Lieutenant Colonel Banastre Tarleton.

Preliminaries

Around the first of June 1780, the British army established a fortified outpost at Rocky Mount on the upper Catawba River, near the North Carolina border, and placed a garrison there under Lieutenant Colonel George Turnbull, a career British officer who commanded a British Provincial regiment called the New York Volunteers. In early July, Turnbull ordered Christian Huck, a Philadelphia lawyer and a captain in Tarleton's British Legion, to find the rebel leaders and persuade other area residents to swear allegiance to the king. A native of Germany, Huck was one of many Pennsylvania Loyalists whose property was confiscated after the British evacuated Philadelphia. He was then banished from the state and joined the British army at New York. Huck held a great deal of bitterness toward Whigs in general, and the Scotch-Irish Presbyterians in particular. During an earlier incursion into what was then called the Upper District between the Broad and Catawba Rivers (modern Chester County, South Carolina), his troops had murdered an unarmed boy, reportedly while he was reading a Bible, and burnt the home and library of Rev. John Simpson, a Whig leader and influential Presbyterian minister. A week later, Huck and his men invaded the New Acquisition District (roughly modern York County, South Carolina), and destroyed the ironworks of William Hill, another influential Whig. Residents who had only wanted to be left alone had then joined the Patriots.

After destroying Hill's Ironworks and putting the rebel garrison there to flight, Huck convened a compulsory meeting of the remaining male residents of the New Acquisition District (mostly men too old to fight), and proclaimed that "God almighty had become a rebel, but if there were twenty gods on that side, they would all be conquered." Huck then stated that "even if the rebels were as thick as trees, and Jesus Christ would come down and lead them, he would still defeat them," following which he and his troopers confiscated all the men's horses. Actions like these quickly earned Huck the nickname "the swearing captain" and further angered the Presbyterian inhabitants of the backcountry. After witnessing Huck's tirade, one resident, Daniel Collins, told his wife, "I have come home determined to take my gun and when I lay it down, I lay down my life with it."

Huck's style in the Catawba River Valley was to rough-up backcountry women, confiscate food and horses, and generally threaten prison and death to any who dared resist the British.  This simply encouraged more men to join the rebels, who were organizing a militia brigade under Brigadier General Thomas Sumter. On July 11, 1780, Huck raided the home of the partisan leader Captain John McClure on Fishing Creek in present-day Chester County, caught his brother and brother-in-law with newly made bullets, and sentenced them to hang as traitors at sunrise the next day. Huck's detachment, consisting of about 35 British Legion dragoons, 20 New York Volunteers, and 60 Loyalist militia, then advanced once more into the New Acquisition and arrived at the plantation of another Whig militia leader, Colonel William Bratton, later that evening. Shortly thereafter, one of Huck's soldiers put a reaping hook to the neck of Col. Bratton's wife, Martha, in an unsuccessful attempt to discover Bratton's whereabouts. Huck's second-in-command, Lieutenant William Adamson of the New York Volunteers, intervened and disciplined the offending Loyalist soldier. Huck next arrested three elderly neighbors of the Brattons, including Col. Bratton's older brother Robert, and told them they too would be executed the next day.

Huck then proceeded a quarter of a mile southeast of Bratton's plantation to the neighboring house of an elderly Whig named James Williamson, where he and his approximately 115 men made camp for the night. The five prisoners were secured in a corncrib to await execution.

Battle
With intelligence provided by John McClure's younger sister, Mary, and a Bratton family slave named Watt, the loosely organized Patriot forces swarmed after Huck. About 150 arrived in the vicinity of Williamson's plantation that night, commanded by experienced militia officers. After a brief reconnaissance and some discussion, they agreed to attack Huck from three directions simultaneously.

Huck's security was extremely lax. Shortly after sunrise, at least two of the Patriot groups managed to attack simultaneously. The British and Loyalist troops were caught completely by surprise; many were still asleep.  The partisans rested their rifles on a split rail fence, from which "they took unerring and deadly aim" at their opponents as they emerged. Huck mounted a horse to rally his troops and was shot in the head by John Carroll, who had loaded two balls in his rifle. Some of the Loyalists surrendered while others fled, hotly pursued by Whigs seeking vengeance.  Tory losses were very high.  Tarleton later reported that only twenty-four men escaped. Patriot losses were one killed and one wounded; the five prisoners were also released from the corncrib unharmed.

Importance
Although the numbers engaged were small, the importance of the skirmish was immediately clear. As South Carolina historian Walter Edgar has written, "The entire backcountry seemed to take heart. Frontier militia had defeated soldiers of the feared British Legion." Volunteers streamed in to join the partisan militia brigade of General Thomas Sumter.

Edgar has called Huck's Defeat "a major turning point in the American Revolution in South Carolina."  It was the first of more than thirty-five important battles in South Carolina in late 1780 and early 1781, all but five of which were partisan victories. This chain of successes was essential to the major Patriot victories at King's Mountain and Cowpens.

See also
 American Revolutionary War § War in the South. Places 'Huck's Defeat' or 'Battle of Williamson's Planation' in overall sequence and strategic context.

References

Further reading
Michael C. Scoggins, The Day It Rained Militia: Huck's Defeat and the Revolution in the South Carolina Backcountry, May–July 1780 (Charleston: The History Press, 2005)
Michael C. Scoggins, "Capt. Christin Huck: A Biography"(July 2002) 
Walter Edgar,  Partisans and Redcoats: The Southern Conflict that turned the Tide of the American Revolution (New York: William Morrow, 2001)
Sam Thomas, "The 1780 Presbyterian Rebellion and the Battle of Huck's Defeat"
Marcus J. Wright, "Huck's Defeat or the Battle of Williamson's Plantation, S.C., July 12, 1780," Publications of the Southern History Association, 1 (October 1897): 247–52.
 Colonel William Bratton Cabin - Battle of Huck's Defeat at Historic Brattonsville

Battles of the American Revolutionary War in South Carolina
Battles involving the United States
Battles involving Great Britain
Battles in the Southern theater of the American Revolutionary War 1780–1783
1780 in the United States
Conflicts in 1780
York County, South Carolina
1780 in South Carolina